Amar Akbar Anthony is a 2018 Indian Telugu-language action drama film co-written and directed by Sreenu Vaitla which features Ravi Teja and Ileana D'Cruz playing the lead Alongside Vikramjeet Virk And Abhimanyu Singh. Also marking the fourth collaboration between Teja and Vaitla after Nee Kosam, Venky and Dubai Seenu, the film was produced by Naveen Yerneni, Y. Ravi Shankar and Mohan Cherukuri under their banner Mythri Movie Makers. Pre-production of the film began in June 2017, and the film's principal photography commenced at New York in April 2018. The narrative centers around Amar, a man suffering from multiple personality disorder, who is on a vengeful killing spree but is often hindered by the emergence of two more personalities he is unaware of.

The film, released worldwide on 16 November 2018, was panned by critics and audiences, becoming a box office flop.

Plot 

Set in New York, the film revolves around Amar, who once freed from the prison, kills a businessman before extracting from him a "Fido" ring. However, Amar is unaware of the fact that he has multiple personality disorder that causes him to assume two more identities in addition to his own. Each identity has a trigger that results in its emergence. Whenever something breaks, he transforms into Akbar, a muslim man who keeps helping the needy. Whenever he sees someone acting abnormally, he transforms into Mark Anthony, a calm doctor. Whenever something explodes, he becomes Amar himself. While as Akbar, he meets Pooja, a young woman who also has MPD. In a gym, a few men try to flirt with her and them telling her to "trust them" triggers the alternate personality which violently beats them up. Pooja is surprised to meet Akbar as Dr. Anthony who soon starts her therapy.

In the meanwhile, FBI officer Balwant Kharge investigates the murder of the first businessman and being a partner, he keeps informing the remaining three businessmen who might be the next targets. Evidences bring him closer to the realization that Amar might be involved in the murder. Pooja's uncle Jalal Akbar unites with her. Her real name is revealed to be Aishwarya. With time, Amar ends up realizing that something is wrong with him. He visits the grave of his parents with flowers but is chased by Kharge and his fellow officers. He tries to kill the next target but somehow fails. He hires Bobby, a random stranger, to find out what's wrong with him. He realizes that he has MPD, while the flashback is revealed in the words of Jalal Akbar to Aishwarya and Dr. Mark Anthony's words to Kharge. It is revealed that Amar and Aishwarya's families were betrayed by four businessmen whom they trust and awarded "Fido" rings. The explosion of their house triggered the disorder in Amar and the menace created by the businessmen triggered it in Aishwarya. The businessmen tried to kill Amar, Aishwarya and Jalal in a subsequent chase but failed. Aishwarya and Amar were admitted to Dr. Anthony's school where they got separated by circumstances.

Back in the present, Amar manages to kill the second businessman by strangulating him while also leaving behind clues that alert Kharge. However, this disorder causes Amar to miss Saboo Menon, the target he earlier failed to kill. He then manipulates the members of WATA, an association for Telugu people, into killing Menon. They're taken in and end up leading Kharge to the truth. Karan Arora, the fourth businessman, calls Amar for a meeting in exchange for Jalal and Aishwarya's freedom. Realizing his loved ones are still alive, Amar arrives for the exchange and in the presence of Kharge and his assistant, breaks into a fight that leaves the henchmen wounded and Arora dead. He extracts the last Fedo ring and then leaves the scene. Kharge is disappointed to realize he kidnapped someone else instead of Aishwarya. Amar then visits his long-left house where he unites with Aishwarya, with Dr. Anthony explaining to Jalal that their mental condition will now start returning to normal. Kharge decides to testify against Amar but instead covers up for him after being blackmailed by a letter.

Cast

Production

Development 
Ravi Teja and Srinu Vaitla who earlier worked in Nee Kosam (1999), Venky (2004) and Dubai Seenu (2007) re-united for this film in June 2017. The title Amar Akbar Anthony was confirmed in November 2017 and Mythri Movie Makers came on board as producers.

Pre-production was started, and the film was launched in March 2018.

Casting 
Anu Emmanuel, who was signed as the female lead, opted out of the project in May 2018 due to date issues. Ileana D'Cruz was signed as the female lead in May 2018, continuing her successful collaboration with Ravi Teja after Kick and Khatarnak, making a comeback to Tollywood after last appearance opposite Ravi again in Devudu Chesina Manushulu (2012).

Filming 
Principal photography commenced in New York on 1 April 2018. The last major schedule started in August 2018 at New York City.

Release 
Vaitla stated in an interview in June 2018 that the film would be released during Dasara. The worldwide release date was announced as 5 October 2018. But the movie was rescheduled to be released on 16 November 2018.

The film was later dubbed and released in Hindi as Amar Akbhar Anthoni on 15 June 2019 on YouTube by Goldmines Telefilms.

Soundtrack 

The music was composed by S. Thaman and released on Lahari Music.

Reception

References

External links

2010s Telugu-language films
2018 action films
Indian action drama films
Indian films about revenge
Films about orphans
Films about dissociative identity disorder
Films shot in New York City
Films scored by Thaman S
Indian films set in New York City
Mythri Movie Makers films